The men's individual competition at the Biathlon World Championships 2011 was held on 8 March 2011.

Result 
The race was started at 17:15.

References

Biathlon World Championships 2011